PLS, or Poculi Ludique Societas, the Medieval & Renaissance Players of Toronto, sponsors productions of early plays, from the beginnings of medieval drama (see mystery play) to as late as the middle of the seventeenth century.

The group had its origins in 1964–1965 in a seminar on medieval drama conducted at the University of Toronto. For more than forty years, PLS was associated with the university's Centre For Medieval Studies (CMS), offering a regular schedule of plays every year. Now, as part of the Centre for Performance Studies in Early Theatre, PLS operates in affiliation with the Centre for Drama, Theatre and Performance Studies. PLS has toured in Canada, the United States and Europe. PLS also collaborates with the theatre history research project Records of Early English Drama (REED) at the University of Toronto.

PLS Productions, 1964–2013

1964
Everyman

1965
Wit and Science by John Redford;
St. George Mummer's Play;
Towneley Secunda Pastorum

1966
Gammer Gurton's Needle;
Mankynde;
A Christmas Revelles

1967
The Play of David;
Coventry Pageant of Shearman and Taylors;
Ralph Roister Doister by Nicholas Udall;
York Crucifixion Sequence

1968
Cambises by Thomas Preston;
Like Will to Like by Ulpian Fulwell;
Towneley Secunda Pastorum;
Towneley Cain and Abel, Noah

1969
The Digby Play of St. Mary Magdalene;
N-Town Adoration of the Magi, Death of Herod;
Towneley Slaughter of the Innocents, Flight into Egypt;
Chester Creation of the World, Noah's Flood;
Hycke Scorner

1970
The Somonyng of Everyman;
Planctus Mariae;
More Dissemblers besides Women by Thomas Middleton;
Mankynde;
The Four PP by John Heywood;
Towneley Prima Pastorum

1971
The Imposture by James Shirley;
Johan Johan by John Heywood, and Once More
Pericles by William Shakespeare;
Lancelot of Denmark and Dame Sirith;
Three Towneley Nativity Pageants

1972
Filius Getronis;
Towneley Mactacio Abel, Noah;
Witt and Wisdome;
Pleasure Reconciled to Virtue by Ben Jonson;
N-Town Assumption of the Virgin;
Towneley Last Judgment

1973
A Re-enactment of the Coronation and the Mass of Henry V;
York Baptism, Temptation;
N-Town Women Taken in Adultery, Colifizacio, Scourging, Crucifixion;
The Franklin's Tale, The Washtub

1974
Fulgens and Lucrece;
Towneley The Talents, The Resurrection;
Officium in Nocte Resurrectionis, Music at the Time of Petrarch;
Pierre Pathelin;
Towneley Secunda Pastorum, York Herod Plays

1975
Magnyfycence by John Skelton;
The Sport of the Friar, The Sport of the Drunken Monk by King Mahendra;
Arden of Faversham

1976
Sampson Dux Fortissime;
Bassingham Mummer's Play;
The Dance of Death by John Lydgate;
Towneley Judgement

1977
Two Cain and Abel Plays (Chester and Towneley);
Visitatio Sepulchri;
Mankynde;
The York Cycle (48 separate pageants)

1978
Romeo and Juliet by William Shakespeare;
Johan Johan by John Heywood;
The Dead Man, The Hot Iron and The Stolen Shrovetide Cock by Hans Sachs;
Nice Wanton;
A Mummer's Play;
A Renaissance High Mass

1979
Much Ado About Nothing by William Shakespeare;
A Winter's Revels;
The Castle of Perseverance;
13th Century Spanish Music;
The World and the Child

1980
The Blessed Apple Tree;
The Taming of the Shrew by William Shakespeare;
Robin Hood and the Friar;
Towneley Murder of Abel, Abraham and Isaac;
The Brome Abraham

1981
Tom Tyler and His Wife;
The Toronto Passion Play;
Hyde Park by James Shirley

1982
Ralph Roister Doister by Nicholas Udall;
Towneley Noah and Secunda Pastorum;
Fool Surgery;
The Pie and the Tart;
Johan Johan (puppet production);
Edward II by Christopher Marlowe;
The Fleury Slaughter of the Innocents;
Aminta by Torquato Tasso

1983
The Play of Daniel;
The Chester Cycle of Mystery Plays (24 separate pageants);
Wit and Science by John Redford

1984
La Calandria;
Doctor Faustus by Christopher Marlowe;
Man's Desire and Fleeting Beauty;
Coventry Christmas Plays

1985
N-Town Death of Herod;
The Dead Husband
The Comedy of Errors by William Shakespeare;
The Towneley Cycle of Mystery Cycles (32 separate pageants);
Wealth and Health;
Towneley Nativity Sequence

1986
The Nun Who Left Her Abbey;
Watkins Ale;
Confessions of Rifflart;
King John by William Shakespeare;
York Nativity Sequence

1987
A Fourteenth Century Easter Matins
Sir Gawain and the Green Knight

1988
The N-Town Pageants: A Medieval History of the World (21 separate pageants);
Homo;
Like Will to Like by Ulpian Fulwell;
The Presentation of the Virgin by Phillipe de Mezieres

1989
Gammer Gurton's Needle;
The Quack Dentist

1990
The Feast of St. Ursula: Lauds and hymns of Hildegard von Bingen;
Everyman;
Jesuskind: Christmas Vespers and Procession

1991
A Looking Glasse for London and England by Thomas Lodge and Robert Greene;
Wisdom;
No Wit, No Help Like a Woman's by Thomas Middleton;
Jesuskind: Christmas Vespers and Procession;
Youth and Hickscorner

1992
N-Town Assumption of the Virgin;
Robin Hood and the Friar

1993
Le Jeu de Robin et Marion;
The Widow's Tears by George Chapman

1994
The Digby Conversion of St. Paul;
A Mery Play betwene Johan Johan the Husbande, Tib his wife, and Sir Johan the Preest;
A Yorkshire Tragedy

1995
Mankind;
Occupacion and Ydelnesse;
Four episodes from the York Cycle: Annunciation, Joseph's Troubles, Nativity, Shepherds;
The Play of Daniel (Joint production with The Toronto Consort)

1996
Three episodes from the York Cycle: Fall and Expulsion, Temptation of Christ, Crucifixion;
Antony and Cleopatra by William Shakespeare;
N-Town Trial of Joseph and Mary and Towneley Second Shepherds' Play;
The Wandering Scholar from Paradise by Hans Sachs

1997
The Joy of Sachs: The Doctor with the Big Nose, The Wandering Scholar from Paradise, The Stolen Shrovetide Cock;
Towneley Noah's Ark;
Gammer Gurton's Needle

1998
The York Cycle (48 separate plays);
Coventry Shearmen and Taylors' Pageant;
The Spanish Tragedy by Thomas Kyd

1999
Chester Antichrist (modern-dress);
The Woman In the Moone by John Lyly

2000
Arden of Feversham

2001
Aminta by Torquato Tasso (co-production with University of Toronto Graduate Centre for Study of Drama );
The Conversion of the Harlot Thais by Hroswitha of Gandersheim;
Robin Hood and the Friar

2002
Troilus and Cressida by William Shakespeare

2003
The Digby Mary Magdalene;
The World and the Child;
The Chester Shepherds

2004
The Chester Antichrist;
The Old Wives Tale by George Peele;
Don Juan, Ladykiller of Seville;
The Second Shepherd's Play and Officium Stellae

2005
Friar Bacon and Friar Bungay by Robert Greene;
Joseph's Trouble About Mary and Jesuskind: Christmas Vespers and Procession

2006
Jesuskind and The York Nativity; King Leir, The Famous Victories of Henry V, Friar Bacon and Friar Bungay (in association with Shakespeare and the Queen’s Men)

2007
The True Tragedy of Richard the Third (co-production with the Graduate Centre for Study of Drama); The N-Town Parliament in Heaven and Annunciation (co-production with SINE NOMINE)

2008
Ram Alley by Lording Barry; N-Town Plays Trial of Mary and Joseph and The Woman Taken in Adultery

2009
Clyomon and Clamydes (co-production with the Graduate Centre for Study of Drama); A Child Shall Be Born: Annunciation and Nativity Pageants from the Chester Cycle

2010
Inside Out: The Persistence of Allegory in Renaissance Performance (co-production with the Graduate Centre for Study of Drama); Chester 2010 (Chester Mystery Plays); What Light Is This? A Medieval Nativity Pageant (York Mystery Plays; co-production with St Thomas’s Anglican Church)

2011
New Custom: A New Interlude, No Less Witty than Pleasant (co-production with the Graduate Centre for Study of Drama); To Seek a Child (Chester Mystery Plays; sponsored by Friends of the Creche at the Cathedral Church of St James)

2012
Behold the Time of Mercy: Medieval pageants for Lent (N-Town Plays; co-production with St Thomas’s Anglican Church); A Christian Turn'd Turk by Robert Daborne (co-production with Centre for Drama, Theatre and Performance Studies); A Medieval Christmas: Go We Hence to Bethlehem’s Bower (N-Town Plays; co-production with St Thomas’s Anglican Church)

2013
Three Farces from Three Lands (The Farce of the Fisherman by Cornelis Everaert, The Stolen Shrovetide Cock by Hans Sachs and Johan Johan The Husband by John Heywood)

2014
Fulgens and Lucres by Henry Medwall

See also
 Mystery play
 Medieval theatre
 Easter Drama
 Passion play
 Wakefield Mystery Plays - a collection of thirty-two mystery plays performed in medieval and early Renaissance England
 York Mystery Plays - a collection of forty-eight mystery plays
 William Shakespeare
 English Renaissance theatre
 The Queen's Men - Queen Elizabeth I's playing company

External links
 Poculi Ludique Societas (PLS) – official website
 Centre for Drama, Theatre and Performance Studies at the University of Toronto
 Shakespeare and the Queen's Men (SQM) theatre project
 Records of Early English Drama (REED) at Victoria University of the University of Toronto
 Centre for Medieval Studies (CMS) at the University of Toronto
Poculi Ludique Societas archival papers held at the University of Toronto Archives and Records Management Services

Theatre companies in Toronto